August is an LGBT American drama film, released in 2011. The full length directorial debut of Eldar Rapaport, the film stars Murray Bartlett as Troy, a man returning to Los Angeles five years after abandoning his long-term relationship with Jonathan (Daniel Dugan) to move to Spain. His return, however, poses problems for Jonathan, whose unresolved feelings and continued attraction to Troy threaten his relationship with his current partner Raul (Adrian Gonzalez).

The film is an expansion of Rapaport's 2005 short film Postmortem, which also starred Bartlett and Dugan.

Cast
 Murray Bartlett as Troy
 Edward Conna as Firm Director (as Eddie Conna)
 Adrian Gonzalez as Raul
 Daniel Dugan as Jonathan
 Kevin McShane as Radio DJ / TV Skit
 Hank Ignacio as Baby
 Bernhard Forcher as Sean
 Maria Chung as Lynn
 Brad Standley as Devin
 Tyler Lee as Straight Couple Husband
 Angelica Lee as Straight Couple Wife
 Massimo Quagliano as Pick Up Guy 1
 Hillary Banks as Nina
 Brenda Lanie as Deli Cashier
 Amy Clites as Lisa / TV Skit / Radio DJ 2
 Brian Sloan as TV news
 Todd Gaebe as Gallery Waiter
 Samantha Manalang as Gallery Waitress
 Scott Romstadt as Pick Up Guy 2
 David LeBarron as Bob
 Tod Macofsky as Ken (as Tod H. Macofsky)
 Mike Vaughn as Nick
 Matt Chaney as Beach Boy 1
 Adam Neely as Beach Boy 2
 Richard Ettley as Repair Man
 Austin Musick as Bistro Hostess
 Matthew Manalang as Bistro Waiters
 Narineh Hacopian as Bistro Waiters
 Jamie Papish as Band Players
 Eduardo J. Torres as Band Players
 David Ben-Ami as Band Players
 David Martinelli as Band Players
 Devon Farr as Belly Dancer

References

External links 
 

2011 films
American drama films
American LGBT-related films
LGBT-related drama films
2011 LGBT-related films
2011 drama films
Gay-related films
2010s American films